देवारगाउँ  is a हिमा गाउपालिका वडा नं. १ देवारगाउँ  in Jumla District in the Karnali Zone of north-western Nepal. At the time of the 1991 Nepal census it had a population of 3434 persons living in 633 individual households.

References

External links
UN map of the VDC of Jumla District

Populated places in Jumla District